Acraea bonasia, the bonasia acraea, is a butterfly in the family Nymphalidae which is native to the African tropics and subtropics.

Range
It is found in Senegal, the Gambia, Guinea-Bissau, Guinea, Sierra Leone, Liberia, Ivory Coast, Ghana, Togo, Nigeria, Cameroon, Equatorial Guinea, Angola, the Democratic Republic of the Congo, Sudan, Uganda, Rwanda, Burundi, Kenya, Tanzania, Zambia and Ethiopia.

Description

A. bonasia is nearly allied both to Acraea alicia and to Acraea sotikensis and all three probably belong to one species. From alicia, which Eltringham regards only as a form of bonasia, it differs in having the base of cellule 2 of the forewing black and from sotikensis it seems to me only to differ in having the light longitudinal stripe at the median of the forewing above completely united with the hindmarginal spot. On this ground I also refer praeponina Stgr. to sotikensis.
 bonasia F. (56 b). Markings of the upper surface yellow-red; the black dots on the underside of the hindwing at least in the cell and cellule 7 connected by red spots or streaks; the marginal band on the underside of the hindwing with light streaks or lines at the veins. The female either only differs from the male in having light marginal spots on the upperside of the hindwing or (ab. cynthius Drury) has the light markings of the upper surface light yellowish. A common and widely distributed species. Sierra Leone to the Congo, Toro and German East Africa.
 female ab. siabona Suff. differs in the yellow subapical band of the forewing and the broader, more variegated marginal band on the underside of the hindwing. Togo. 
 banka Eltr. differs in having the marginal bands of the under surface pure black without stripes and the black dots on the hindwing beneath united into a subbasal band. Abyssinia. 
 Larva bluish white with more or less developed dark longitudinal lines; the spines on segments 1 to 3 and 11 to 13 blackish, the rest light.

Biology

The habitat consists of forests.

Adult males mud-puddle and visit patches of urine and animal excrement.

The larvae feed on Clappertonia ficifolia, Triumfetta macrophilla, Triumfetta ruwenzorensis, Triumfetta brachyceras, Triumfetta and Hibiscus species.

Subspecies
Acraea bonasia bonasia — Senegal, Gambia, Guinea-Bissau, Guinea, Sierra Leone, Liberia, Ivory Coast, Ghana, Togo, Nigeria, Cameroon, Bioko, Angola, Democratic Republic of the Congo, Sudan (south), Uganda (west), Rwanda, Burundi, western Kenya, north-western Tanzania, north-eastern Zambia
Acraea bonasia banka Eltringham, 1912 — Ethiopia: highlands

Taxonomy
Acraea bonasia is the nominate member of the Acraea bonasia species group see Acraea.

Classification of Acraea by Henning, Henning & Williams, Pierre. J. & Bernaud
Hyalites (group bonasia) Henning, 1993 
Acraea (Actinote) (subgroup bonasia) Pierre & Bernaud, 2013
Telchinia (Telchinia) Henning & Williams, 2010 
Acraea (Actinote)   groupe serena  sub group  bonasia Pierre & Bernaud, 2014

References

External links
Die Gross-Schmetterlinge der Erde 13: Die Afrikanischen Tagfalter. Plate XIII 56 b as both bonasia and praeponina.

External links

Images representing Acraea bonasia at Bold
Acraea bonasia bonasia at Pteron

Butterflies described in 1775
bonasia
Taxa named by Johan Christian Fabricius